The Evening Standard Theatre Award for Best Play is an annual award presented by the Evening Standard since 1955, in recognition of achievement in British theatre.

Winners and nominees

1950s

1960s

1970s

1980s

1990s

2000s

2010s

Multiple awards and nominations

Awards 
6 awards

 Tom Stoppard

3 awards

 Alan Ayckbourn
 Michael Frayn
 Peter Nichols

2 awards

 Edward Albee
Howard Brenton
Jez Butterworth
Simon Gray
Willis Hall
 Lucienne Hill
John Osborne

Nominations 
3 nominations

 Caryl Churchill
 Martin McDonagh

2 nominations

 Annie Baker
 Mike Bartlett
 Richard Bean
 Jez Butterworth
 James Graham
 Lucy Kirkwood
 Bruce Norris
 Lynn Nottage
 Lucy Prebble
 Roy Williams

See also 

 Laurence Olivier Award for Best New Play
 Critics' Circle Theatre Award for Best New Play
 Tony Award for Best Play

References

External links 

 Evening Standard Theatre Award Winners 1980-2003
 Evening Standard Theatre Awards 1955-2000

Award ceremonies
Evening Standard Awards